Chandrahari is a 1941 Indian, Tamil language film directed by K. S. Mani. The film stars N. S. Krishnan, T. A. Mathuram.

Plot
It is a spoof of a legendary story of King Harishchandra who never told a lie. The main character of this story, King Chandrahari, will never tell a truth. Sage Vistavasi challenges Yama that he will make Chandrahari to tell a truth. He leaves the heavenly abode and comes to Earth with 9000 gold coins. He asks Chandrahari to give him 1000 gold coins to make it 10,000. The king says he does not have even a penny. The sage gives the 9000 coins to the king as a loan and goes away. During a nightly rounds, the king meets two women in a hut and misbehaves with them. The sage learns of this incident and demands the king to marry the women. The king abdicates his kingdom and walks away with his wife and son. The sage takes over the kingdom. Many complications follow and finally the king wins. The sage restores everything to normalcy.

Cast
List adapted from the song book

 N. S. Krishnan as Chandrahari
 T. A. Mathuram as Mathichandrai
 Radhakrishnan as Dhasadevan
 C. P. Kittan as Sathyakirthi
 L. Narayana Rao as Esha Nakshatran
 P. G. Kuppusami as Sishtavasi
 M. Thiruvenkatam as Mithravasu

 Narasimhachari as Kandakalan
 Kamalam as Kandakali
 Shankara Moorthi as Sivan
 Velu Pillai as Yaman
 Lakshmi Narayanan as Bhaguveer
 Babuji as Girl Dancer
 Lalitha as Girl Dancer

Production
This was a stage play of the same name by Pammal Sambandha Mudaliar, one of the two founding fathers of Tamil theatre (the other being Sankaradas Swamigal). N. S. Krishnan adapted it and produced as a film under his own banner Asoka Films. The film was directed by K. S. Mani. Cinematography was handled by E. R. Cooper while the editing was done by Surya. The film was shot at Central Studios, Coimbatore.

As this was a short film, it was package as part 2 with another film Ezhandha Kadhal (Part 1).

Reception
Film historian Randor Guy wrote in 2014 that the film is "Remembered for the humorous dialogue with satire and the performances of NSK and Mathuram as the lead pair.

References

Indian comedy films
Indian black-and-white films
Indian films based on plays
1940s Tamil-language films
1941 comedy films
1941 films
Films directed by K. S. Mani